Barry O'Mahony (born 26 September 1986) is an Irish rugby union player. He plays club rugby for Clontarf in the All-Ireland League.

Munster
O'Mahony completed the 3-year Munster academy, but was released. After a series of impressive performances for Clontarf, he was called into the Munster 'A' team during their 2011–12 British and Irish Cup campaign, putting in a string of important performances on the way to winning the tournament. At the conclusion of the 2011–12 season, O'Mahony was given a development contract in the senior Munster squad.

He made his full Munster debut on 1 September 2012, as a replacement in Munster's opening 2012–13 Pro 12 league fixture against Edinburgh at Murrayfield. O'Mahony extended his development contract for a further year in early April 2013. He made his first start for Munster in a United Rugby Championship fixture against Cardiff Blues on 8 February 2014. He signed a one-year development contract extension in March 2014. In June 2015, it was announced that O'Mahony would be leaving Munster.

References

External links
Munster Profile

Living people
1987 births
People educated at Crescent College
Rugby union players from Limerick (city)
Irish rugby union players
Garryowen Football Club players
Clontarf FC players
Munster Rugby players
Rugby union flankers